Erisma is a genus of flowering plants belonging to the family Vochysiaceae.

Its native range is Panama to Southern Tropical America.

Species:

Erisma arietinum 
Erisma bicolor 
Erisma blancoa 
Erisma bracteosum 
Erisma calcaratum 
Erisma costatum 
Erisma djalma-batistae 
Erisma floribundum 
Erisma fuscum 
Erisma gracile 
Erisma japura 
Erisma lanceolatum 
Erisma laurifolium 
Erisma megalophyllum 
Erisma micranthum 
Erisma nitidum 
Erisma panamense 
Erisma silvae 
Erisma splendens 
Erisma tessmannii 
Erisma uncinatum

References

Vochysiaceae
Myrtales genera